The 1999 NCAA Division II Men's Soccer Championship was the 28th annual tournament held by the NCAA to determine the top men's Division II college soccer program in the United States.

Undefeated defending champions Southern Connecticut State (20-0) defeated Fort Lewis, 2–1, in the tournament final, after two overtime periods. This was the second consecutive and sixth overall national title for the Owls, who were coached by Tom Lang.

Bracket

Final

See also  
 NCAA Division I Men's Soccer Championship
 NCAA Division III Men's Soccer Championship
 NAIA Men's Soccer Championship

References 

NCAA Division II Men's Soccer Championship
NCAA Division II Men's Soccer Championship
NCAA Division II Men's Soccer Championship
NCAA Division II Men's Soccer Championship